Air University may refer to:

 Air University (United States Air Force), at Maxwell Air Force Base, Alabama, United States
 Air University (Pakistan Air Force), in Islamabad, Pakistan
 Air University (South Korean Air Force), in Yuseong-gu, South Korea